Adhirasam,  in Kannada,  in Telugu,  in Marathi,  in Chhattisgarhi or  in Odia) is a type of Indian sweet from Tamil cuisine, Karnataka cuisine, Telugu cuisine, Chhattisgarhi cuisine, Marathi cuisine and Odia cuisine. The doughnut-like pastry has a long history of popularity in Kannada, Telugu, Maharashtra, Chhattisgarh, Odisha, and Tamil civilization. They are similar in shape to vadai, but are not savoury and are eaten as a dessert.

Adhirasam is a popular as an offering to the relatives during Deepavali festival, both at home and in temples in Tamil Nadu and Karnataka.

Historical and cultural significance
According to inscriptions from the 16th century Vijayanagara emperor Krishnadevaraya's time, the sweet was made from rice flour, jaggery, butter and pepper. At the annual festival at the Panchavarnesvar Temple in Nallur (located near Kumbakonam, Tamil Nadu), an offering of 6000 Adhirasams along with 6000 vadas is made to the Gods; the entire lot is cooked in the temple kitchen between sunrise and 11 pm, for the prayers that take place at midnight. It is most common Deepavali sweet preparation for Tamil people.

Preparation
The authentic preparation takes about a week. First the rice is soaked in water and dried in shade and ground into a fine powder when the rice is 3/4th dried and retains some moisture. For adding sweet "vellam" (jaggery in Tamil) is melted in water by boiling it till it reaches 'soft ball' consistency (if using a candy thermometer) and added to the rice flour along with some powdered cardamom to make a thick dough. It is then transferred to an earthenware pot and the top of the pot is closed with a thin white cloth. It is then allowed to ferment for about 3–5 days by placing it in the sunlight during the day time. Finally when the batter is ready for preparation, small balls of the dough is taken and flattened using fingers in a small piece of oil brushed banana leaf and deep fried in oil until golden brown. Then it is pressed with a flat bottomed bowl to remove the excess oil.

See also
Karnataka cuisine
Tamil cuisine
List of fried dough foods
List of doughnut varieties

References

External links

 Recipe on Foodista.com

Karnataka cuisine
Tamil cuisine
Indian desserts
Indian snack foods